Sherard Bay is an Arctic waterway in Qikiqtaaluk Region, Nunavut, Canada. Located off northern Melville Island's Sabine Peninsula, the bay is an arm of Byam Martin Channel. Eden Bay and Weatherall Bay are nearby.

References

Bays of Qikiqtaaluk Region